Nižný Lánec is a village and municipality in Košice-okolie District in the Kosice Region of eastern Slovakia.

History
In historical records, the village was first mentioned in 1268.

Geography
The village lies at an altitude of 200 metres and covers an area of 4.1 km².
It has a population of 417 people.

External links

Villages and municipalities in Košice-okolie District